William Salmond may refer to:

 Sir William Salmond (British Army officer) (1840–1932), British Army general
 Sir Geoffrey Salmond (William Geoffrey Hanson Salmond, 1878–1933), British commander in the Royal Flying Corps during WWI
 William Salmond (Presbyterian minister) (1835–1917), New Zealand Presbyterian minister, university professor and writer

See also
William Salmon (disambiguation)